Tsinghua University Press (TUP) is the publishing house of Tsinghua University in Beijing, China. It was established in June 1980.

According to Publishers Weekly in 2015, TUP releases "3,000 new titles and 20 journals" annually.

Notes

Tsinghua University
Book publishing companies of China
Publishing companies established in 1980
Companies based in Beijing
University presses of China
Mass media in Beijing
Chinese companies established in 1980